Dubawnt Lake is a lake in the Kivalliq Region, Nunavut, Canada. To the northwest is the Thelon Wildlife Sanctuary. Its main inlet and outlet is the north-flowing Dubawnt River which joins the Thelon River at Beverly Lake. The Thelon flows east to Hudson Bay at Chesterfield Inlet. It is on the line of contact between the Sayisi Dene band of Eastern Caribou-Eater Chipewyan people and the Harvaqtuurmiut and Ihalmiut bands of Caribou Inuit. The first recorded European to reach the lake was Samuel Hearne in 1770, but it remained largely unknown to outsiders until it was explored by Joseph Tyrrell in 1893. There are no permanent settlements but there are fly-in fish camps where large lake trout can be caught during the two month  ice-free season.

Dubawnt River

There is a portage from the Flett Lake tributary of Wholdaia Lake to Selwyn Lake which drains southwest to Lake Athabasca. In 1893 Joseph Tyrrell canoed from Lake Athabasca down the Dubawnt to Chesterfield Inlet. Lakes along the river are Wholdaia, Barlow, Cary, Markham, Nicholson, Dubawnt, (Dubawnt Gorge), Grant, Wharton and Beverly. East of the Dubawnt, the Kazan River also flows north to join the Thelon.

Ethnography

The area of the lake was once home to Ihalmiut, a Caribou Inuit group.

Wildlife
Dubawnt Lake is home to many animals, including foxes, wolves and many birds of prey.

See also
List of lakes of Nunavut
List of lakes of Canada

References 

Lakes of Kivalliq Region